2R0I2P0 is the eighth collaborative release by the Japanese experimental band Boris and noise musician Merzbow. It features several rerecorded tracks that first appeared on Boris' album Love & Evol, and a cover of the Melvins song "Boris", which the band is named after. It was released in December 2020.

A video was released for the track "Away from You" on October 19, 2020.

Background
The title stands for "2020 rest in peace", with Boris noting that "This year was a period of trial for everyone in the world". At the time of 2R0I2P0'''s release, the last time Boris performed before an audience was with Merzbow in Melbourne, Australia on February 29, 2020. The recording was finished in mid-March and submitted to the label in May. The album was completed before No''.

Track listing

Personnel
All personnel credits adapted from the album notes.

Boris
Takeshi – vocals, guitar, bass
Wata – vocals, guitar, echo
Atsuo – vocals, percussion, electronics

Merzbow
Masami Akita – computer, percussion, noise electronics

Technical personnel
Amak Golden – Boris tracks recording
Fangsanalsatan – Boris tracks recording, total mix, design
Soichiro Nakamura – basic mix, mastering

References

External links
2R0I2P0 at Bandcamp
"Away From You" (Official Music Video) at YouTube
"Boris" (Official Music Video) at YouTube

2020 albums
Collaborative albums
Boris (band) albums
Merzbow albums